The 1985 Coppa Italia Final was the final of the 1984–85 Coppa Italia. The match was played over two legs on 30 June and 3 July 1985 between Sampdoria and Milan. Sampdoria won 3–1 on aggregate.

First leg

Second leg

References
Coppa Italia 1984/85 statistics at rsssf.com
 https://www.calcio.com/calendario/ita-coppa-italia-1984-1985-finale/2/
 https://www.worldfootball.net/schedule/ita-coppa-italia-1984-1985-finale/2/

Coppa Italia Finals
Coppa Italia Final 1985
Coppa Italia Final 1985